In Ohio, State Route 280 may refer to:
Interstate 280 in Ohio, the only Ohio highway numbered 280 since about 1962
Ohio State Route 280 (1930s-1960s), now SR 329 (Amesville to Trimble)